718 Erida is a minor planet orbiting the Sun. It was discovered at Vienna on September 29, 1911, by Austrian astronomer Johann Palisa, and was named for Erida Leuschner, daughter of astronomer Armin Otto Leuschner. The orbital plane of this asteroid is inclined by an angle of 6.9° to the plane of the ecliptic.

It spans a girth of approximately 72 km.

References

External links
 
 

Background asteroids
Erida
Erida
X-type asteroids (SMASS)
19110929